Gnoma vittaticollis is a species of beetle in the family Cerambycidae. It was described by Per Olof Christopher Aurivillius in 1923. It is known from Borneo and the Philippines.

References

Lamiini
Beetles described in 1923